Burr is an unincorporated community in Florida Township, Yellow Medicine County, in the U.S. state of Minnesota.

History
Burr was originally called Stanley, and under the latter name was platted by the railroad in 1886.  The current name is for Burr Anderson, an early settler.

A post office was established as Burr in 1894; it was closed in 1953.

References

Unincorporated communities in Yellow Medicine County, Minnesota
Unincorporated communities in Minnesota